The Roman Catholic Archdiocese of Lima is part of the Roman Catholic Church in Peru which enjoys full communion with the Holy See. The Archdiocese was founded as the Diocese of Lima on 14 May 1541. The diocese was raised to the level of a metropolitan archdiocese by Pope Paul III on 12 February 1546.  One of its archbishops was the saint Torribio Mogrovejo.

The suffragan dioceses are: Callao, Carabayllo, Chosica, Huacho, Ica, Lurín, and (Territorial Prelature) Yauyos.   From 1999 to 2019 the Archbishop of Lima was Juan Luis Cipriani Thorne, made Cardinal in 2001. The Archbishop's Palace of Lima is the headquarters of the archdiocese.

Ordinaries

Diocese of Lima
Erected: 14 May 1541
Jerónimo de Loayza, O.P. (13 May 1541 – 25 October 1575)

Archdiocese of Lima
Elevated: 12 February 1546
Diego Gómez de Lamadrid, O.SS.T. (27 Mar 1577 – 13 June 1578) Appointed, Archbishop (Personal Title) of Badajoz
St. Toribio Alfonso de Mogrovejo (16 May 1579 – 23 May 1606) Died
Bartolomé Lobo Guerrero (19 Nov 1607 – 12 January 1622) Died
Gonzalo del Campo (López de Ocampo) (2 Oct 1623 – 15 October 1627) Died
Hernando de Arias y Ugarte (1630 – 27 January 1638) Died
Pedro de Villagómez Vivanco (16 Jul 1640 – 12 May 1671) Died
Juan de Almoguera, O.SS.T. (6 May 1674 – 2 March 1676) Died
Melchor de Liñán y Cisneros (14 Jun 1677 – 28 June 1708) Died
Antonio de Zuloaga (21 May 1714 – 21 January 1722) Died
Diego Morcillo Rubio de Suñón de Robledo, O.SS.T. (12 May 1723 – 12 March 1730) Died
Juan Francisco Antonio de Escandón, C.R. (1732 – 28 April 1739) Died
José Antonio Gutiérrez y Ceballos (11 Nov 1740 – 16 January 1745) Died
Agustín Rodríguez Delgado (14 Jun 1746 – 18 December 1746) Died
Pedro Antonio Barroeta y Ángel (18 Sep 1748 – 19 December 1757) Appointed, Archbishop of Granada
Diego del Corro (13 Mar 1758 – 28 January 1761) Died
Diego Antonio de Parada (25 Jan 1762 – 23 April 1779) Died
Juan Domingo González de la Reguera (18 Sep 1780 – 8 March 1805) Died
Bartolomé María de las Heras Navarro (31 Mar 1806 – 6 September 1823) Died
Jorge Benavente Macoaga (23 Jun 1834 – 10 March 1839) Died
Francisco de Sales Arrieta Ortiz (13 Jul 1840 – 4 May 1843) Died
Francisco Javier Luna-Pizarro y Pacheco de Chávez (24 Apr 1845 – 4 February 1855) Died
José Manuel Pasquel Losada (28 Sep 1855 – 15 October 1857) Died
José Sebastian Goyeneche y Barreda (26 Sep 1859 – 19 February 1872) Died
Manuel Teodoro del Valle Seoane (29 Aug 1872 – 19 November 1872) Resigned
Francisco de Asis Orueta y Castrillón (21 Mar 1873 – ?) Died
Manuel Antonio Bandini Mazuelos (1889–1898) Died
Manuel Tovar y Chamorro (22 Aug 1898 – 25 May 1907) Died
Pedro Manuel García Naranjó (19 Dec 1907 – 10 September 1917) Died
Emilio Juan Francisco Lissón y Chávez, C.M. (25 Feb 1918 – 3 March 1931) Resigned
Pedro Pascuál Francesco Farfán de los Godos (18 Sep 1933 – 17 September 1945) Died
Cardinal Juan Guevara (16 Dec 1945 – 27 November 1954) Died
Cardinal Juan Landázuri Ricketts, O.F.M. (2 May 1955 – 30 December 1989) Retired
Cardinal Augusto Vargas Alzamora, S.J. (30 Dec 1989 – 9 January 1999) Retired
Cardinal Juan Luis Cipriani Thorne (9 Jan 1999 – 25 January 2019) Retired
Carlos Castillo Mattasoglio (25 January 2019 – present)

Other affiliated bishops

Coadjutor archbishop
Juan Landázuri Ricketts, O.F.M. (1952–1955); future Cardinal

Auxiliary bishops
°Antonio Vigo, O. de M. (1664–1666), did not take effect
Blasius de Aguinaga (1669), did not take effect
Nicolás de Ulloa y Hurtado de Mendoza, O.S.A. (1677–1679), appointed Bishop of Córdoba (Tucumán), Argentina
 Francisco Cisneros y Mendoza (1702–1724)
Pedro Morcillo Rubio de Auñón (1724–1731), appointed Bishop of Panamá
Francisco Gutiérrez Galeano (1738–1745), appointed Bishop of Ayacucho o Huamanga (Guamanga)
Francisco Javier Luna-Pizarro y Pacheco de Chávez (1836–1845), appointed Archbishop here
José Manuel Pasquel y Losada (1848–1855), appointed Archbishop here
Francisco de Asis Orueta y Castrillón, C.O. (1855–1859), appointed Bishop of Trujillo (later returned here as Archbishop)
Pedro José Tordoya Montoya (1860–1875), appointed Bishop of Cuzco
Pedro Ignacio de Benavente y del Castillo (1865–1883)
Manuel Antonio Bandini Mazuelos (1879–1889), appointed Archbishop here
José María Carpenter Aponte (1891–1905)
Manuel Tovar y Chamorro (1891–1898), appointed Archbishop here
Julian Cáceres Negrón (1901–1904)
Segundo Ballón Manrique (1909–1923)
José Gregorio Castro Miranda, O.F.M. (1917–1924)
Leonardo José Rodriguez Ballón, O.F.M. (1943–1945), appointed Bishop of Huancayo
Federico Pérez Silva, C.M. (1946–1952), appointed Coadjutor Bishop of Piura
Fidel Mario Tubino Mongilardi (1956–1973)
José Antonio Dammert Bellido (1958–1962), appointed Bishop of Cajamarca
Mario Renato Cornejo Radavero (1961–1969)
Luis Armando Bambarén Gastelumendi, S.J. (1967–1978), appointed Prelate of Chimbote
Germán Schmitz Sauerborn, M.S.C. (1970–1990)
Augusto Beuzeville Ferro (1973–1990), appointed Auxiliary Bishop of Piura
Alberto Aurelio Brazzini Diaz-Ufano (1978–2001)
Alfredo Noriega Arce, S.J. (1980–1993)
Javier Miguel Ariz Huarte, O.P. (1980–1995)
Hugo Garaycoa Hawkins (1982–1991), appointed Bishop of Tacna
Héctor Miguel Cabrejos Vidarte, O.F.M. (1988–1996), appointed Bishop of Peru, Military
Oscar Julio Alzamora Revoredo, S. M. (1991–1999)
Norbert Klemens Strotmann Hoppe, M.S.C. (1992–1997), appointed Bishop of Chosica
José Antonio Eguren Anselmi, S.C.V. (2002–2006), appointed Archbishop of Piura
Carlos Enrique García Camader (2002–2006), appointed Bishop of Lurín
Adriano Tomasi Travaglia, O.F.M. (2002–2019)
Guillermo Martín Abanto Guzmán (2009–2012), appointed Bishop of Peru, Military
Raúl Antonio Chau Quispe (2009–2019), appointed Auxiliary Bishop of Arequipa
Guillermo Teodoro Elías Millares (2019-)
Ricardo Augusto Rodríguez Álvarez (2019-)

Other priests of this diocese who became bishops
Diego Montero del Aguila, appointed Bishop of Concepción, Chile in 1708
Juan Manuel Moscoso y Peralta, appointed Auxiliary Bishop of Arequipa in 1770
José Vicente Silva Avilés y Olave Salaverría, appointed Bishop of Ayacucho o Huamanga (Guamanga) in 1815; did not take effect
Pedro Gutiérrez de Cos y Saavedra Seminario, appointed Bishop of Ayacucho o Huamanga (Guamanga) in 1818
Juan Rodríguez Reymúndez, appointed Bishop of Ayacucho o Huamanga (Guamanga) in 1838; did not take effect
Agustín Guillermo Charún Espinoza, appointed Bishop of Trujillo in 1853
Bartolomé Manuel Herrera Vélez, appointed Bishop of Arequipa in 1859
Juan María Ambrosio Huerta Galván, appointed Bishop of Puno in 1865
José Francisco Ezequiel Moreyra, appointed Bishop of Ayacucho o Huamanga (Guamanga) in 1865
Juan José de Polo Valenzuela, appointed Bishop of Ayacucho o Huamanga (Guamanga) in 1875
Manuel Santiago Medina y Bañon, appointed Bishop of Trujillo in 1889
Ismaele Puirredón, appointed Bishop of Puno in 1889
Juan Antonio Falcón Iturrizaga, appointed Bishop of Cuzco in 1893
Carlos Garcia Irigoyen, appointed Bishop of Trujillo in 1910
Salvador Piñeiro García-Calderón, appointed Bishop of Peru, Military in 2001
Cristóbal Bernardo Mejía Corral (priest here, 1989–1996), appointed Bishop of Chulucanas in 2020

References

Lima
Lima

1541 establishments in the Spanish Empire
Religious organizations established in the 1540s
Lima